The following is the list of the Toulouse Metro stations in Toulouse, France.

Line A 

Line A of the Toulouse Metro opened in June 1993 and later extended from Jolimont to Balma-Gramont in 2002. It currently serves 18 stations distributed along .

Balma-Gramont
Argoulets
Roseraie
Jolimont
Marengo-SNCF (transfer: SNCF main station)
Jean-Jaurès (transfer: Metro B)
Capitole
Esquirol
Saint-Cyprien - République
Patte-d'Oie
Arènes (transfer: Tram T1, Tram T2, Line C, SNCF station)
Fontaine-Lestang
Mermoz
Bagatelle
Mirail-Université
Reynerie
Bellefontaine
Basso-Cambo

Line B 

Line B of the Toulouse Metro opened on 30 June 2007.

Borderouge
Trois Cocus
La Vache
Barrière de Paris
Minimes
Canal du Midi
Compans-Caffarelli
Jeanne d'Arc
Jean-Jaurès (transfer: Metro A)
François-Verdier
Carmes
Palais de Justice (transfer: Tram T1, Tram T2)
Saint-Michel Marcel-Langer
Empalot 
Saint-Agne SNCF (transfer: SNCF station)
Saouzelong
Rangueil
Faculté de Pharmacie
Université Paul-Sabatier
Ramonville

Labège extension of Line B (projected opening - 2024) 
Note: these are temporary names of the stations given by Tisséo
Parc Technologique du Canal
INPT (transfer station for Toulouse Aerospace Express)

Toulouse Aerospace Express (planned) 
The Toulouse Aerospace Express is expected to open in 2028. These are temporary names of the stations given by Tisséo.

Colomiers Gare (transfer station for line C)
Airbus Colomiers Ramassiers
Airbus Saint-Martin
Jean Maga (transfer station for line T1 and Aeroport Express)
Sept Deniers
Boulevard de Suisse
Fondeyre
La Vache (transfer station for line B)
Toulouse-Lautrec
Raynal
Bonnefoy
Matabiau - Marengo (transfer station for line A, D and F)
François Verdier (transfer station for line B)
Jean Rieux
Côte Pavée
L'Ormeau
Montaudran
Airbus Defense & Space
INPT (transfer station for line B)
Enova
La Cadène (transfer station for line F)

See also 
 List of metro systems

References

External links 
 Line B of the Metro (Wayback Machine)
Metro of Toulouse on UrbanRail.Net

Toulouse
Toulouse Metro
Toulouse